Lucas Pereira Mendes (born 28 February 1991), known as Lucas Mendes, is a Brazilian footballer who currently plays as a right back for Operário-PR, on loan from Ferroviária

Career statistics

Club

Notes

References

1991 births
Living people
Brazilian footballers
Association football defenders
Campeonato Brasileiro Série C players
Campeonato Brasileiro Série D players
Esporte Clube Bahia players
Oeste Futebol Clube players
Olaria Atlético Clube players
Luverdense Esporte Clube players
Esporte Clube Ypiranga players
Associação Atlética Santa Rita players
Serrano Sport Club players
Botafogo Futebol Clube (PB) players
Estanciano Esporte Clube players
FC Atlético Cearense players
Iporá Esporte Clube players
Associação Atlética Anapolina players
Concórdia Atlético Clube players
Associação Desportiva São Caetano players
Associação Ferroviária de Esportes players
People from Feira de Santana
Sportspeople from Bahia